Peter McArdle (born 1965) is an English artist.

Peter McArdle may also refer to:

Pete McArdle (1929–1985), Irish-American long-distance runner
Peter McArdle (footballer) (1914–1979), born 1911, English footballer
Peter J. McArdle (1874–1940), Pittsburgh City Council member

See also  
Peter McCardle (born 1955), New Zealand politician